Workers' Democracy is a small Trotskyist group in Poland. Originally named Socialist Solidarity, it is affiliated with the International Socialist Tendency.

External links
Pracownicza Demokracja web site (in Polish)

International Socialist Tendency
Organizations with year of establishment missing
Trotskyist organisations in Poland